Tadej Pogačar (born 21 September 1998) is a Slovenian cyclist who currently rides for UCI WorldTeam . He won the 2020 and 2021 editions of the Tour de France, winning three different jerseys during each Tour, a feat unseen in nearly four decades.

In 2019, he became the youngest cyclist to win a UCI World Tour race with the Tour of California win at the age of 20. Later in the year, in his debut Grand Tour, Pogačar won three stages of the Vuelta a España en route to an overall third-place finish and the young rider title. In both his Tour de France debut and the following year, he won three stages and the race overall, as well as the mountains and young-rider classifications, becoming the only rider to win these three classifications simultaneously. He is the first Slovenian winner, and, at the age of 21, the second-youngest winner after Henri Cornet, who won in 1904 at the age of 19. He is the first road cyclist in history to break the 6,000-point barrier in UCI World Ranking.

He has won three one-day Monuments (Liège–Bastogne–Liège once and Giro di Lombardia twice), Paris-Nice once and Tirreno–Adriatico on two occasions.

In 2021, he also made history when he became the first Tour de France winner to take an Olympic medal in the road race in the same year after he took bronze at the men's road race.

He is the current men's UCI road racing world No.1 with record 87 weeks in total spending on top of it and record 77 consecutive weeks. He finished the season as the year-end No.1 (2021, 2022).

Career

Early career
Pogačar followed his older brother Tilen in joining the Rog Ljubljana club at the age of nine. In 2011 he came to the attention of Road World Championship medallist Andrej Hauptman, who is as of 2021 his coach and head coach and selector for the Slovenian national cycling team. Hauptman watched Pogačar pursuing a group of much older teenagers from 100 metres behind. Thinking that Pogačar was struggling to keep up with the older riders, he told the race organisers that they should provide some assistance to Pogačar: the organisers explained that the younger rider was in fact about to lap the group he was chasing. Hauptman subsequently managed Pogačar as an under-23 rider with the  team, before joining UAE Team Emirates as a directeur sportif in May 2019, after Pogačar joined the team.

UAE Team Emirates (2019 – Present)

2019

Pogačar joined  from the 2019 season, a deal that was made ahead of the 2018 Tour de l'Avenir, which he won. He made his debut for the team at the Tour Down Under, where he finished 13th overall. He went on to win the Volta ao Algarve, taking the race lead after winning the second stage. He also placed sixth at the Tour of the Basque Country. In May 2019, he won the Tour of California, becoming the youngest rider to win a UCI WorldTour stage race. He took the race lead after winning the queen stage to Mount Baldy on stage 6. In June, Pogačar won the Slovenian national time trial championship after beating Matej Mohorič by 29 seconds.

In August, Pogačar was named in the team's startlist for the Vuelta a España, his debut in a Grand Tour. In the first week, he performed strongly, placing himself in the top ten on GC before winning his first Grand Tour stage on the rain-soaked stage to Cortals d'Encamp. The win allowed him to move inside the top five on GC. On stage 13, which finished on the steep climb of Los Machucos, he was the only rider to stay with the race leader and his compatriot, Primož Roglič. Pogačar ended up winning his second stage to move up to third overall, where he stayed heading into the second rest day. After losing time on stage 18, he dropped down to fifth on GC. On the penultimate stage, with one last chance to move up the standings, Pogačar launched an attack, going on an almost  solo breakaway. He eventually took his third stage win, winning by more than a minute and a half over the rest of the contenders. The win allowed him to finish the Vuelta in third overall, the final podium position, and giving him the victory in the young rider classification.

2020

Before the season started, Pogačar announced that he was making his debut at the Tour de France, where he planned on riding in support of Fabio Aru. He made his season debut at the Volta a la Comunitat Valenciana, where he won two stages on his way to winning the race. At the curtailed UAE Tour, he won the fifth stage, which finished atop the Jebel Hafeet, and finishing second to Adam Yates on GC. In March, cycling events were among those postponed by the COVID-19 pandemic. When the season resumed, he took fourth overall in the Critérium du Dauphiné. In the Slovenian national championships, he finished second to Primož Roglič in the road race before defeating him in the time trial, defending his title.

In the Tour de France, Pogačar quickly demonstrated that he was in better form than Aru, his team's initial leader, after finishing second to Roglič on stage four, which finished atop the climb of Orcières-Merlette. However, he lost almost a minute and a half on stage 7, which was affected by crosswinds. The next day, he began to claw back time when he attacked on the Col de Peyresourde, gaining back 38 seconds over the rest of the contenders. After Aru withdrew on stage 9, Pogacar won the stage to Laruns, his first Tour stage win, by outsprinting Egan Bernal and Roglič, who took the maillot jaune, as well as Marc Hirschi, who had been on an  solo breakaway. On stage 13, which finished atop the steep climb of Puy Mary, he was the only rider to stay with Roglič and moving up to second overall at 44 seconds down. He also took the lead in the young rider classification in the process. Two days later, he outsprinted Roglič at the top of the Col du Grand Colombier to take his second stage of the race.

At the beginning of the third week, Pogačar sat in second overall at 40 seconds behind Roglič. On stage 17, the queen stage which finished atop the Col de la Loze, he struggled to follow Roglič before eventually losing 17 seconds. Ahead of the penultimate stage, a  time trial finishing at La Planche des Belles Filles, Pogačar faced a 57 second deficit to Roglič. At the first time check, he had already managed to claw back 13 seconds from his compatriot. He headed into the final climb with a lead of 36 seconds and a deficit of 21 seconds on the virtual GC. On the climb, Pogačar continued to gradually gain time before going into the virtual maillot jaune with  left. He eventually took the stage victory, almost a minute and a half ahead of Tom Dumoulin while Roglič finished almost two minutes down. His third stage win of the race, the result meant he took the maillot jaune with a lead of 59 seconds on Roglič and also the lead in the mountain classification. The next day, he finished safely in the peloton to officially win the Tour, becoming the first Slovenian winner of the race. At the age of 21, he also became the second youngest winner of the Tour, just behind Henri Cornet, who won the Tour in 1904 at the age of 19. In addition to winning the Tour, he also won the young rider classification as well as the mountains classification. The previous rider to win three jerseys was Eddy Merckx in 1972. He became the twelfth rider to win the Tour de France on his first attempt, and the first since 1983.

After the Tour, Pogačar competed in the men's road race at the World Championships where he rode in support of Roglič, who eventually finished in sixth place. Three days later, he competed at La Flèche Wallonne where he finished in ninth place. He ended his season at Liège–Bastogne–Liège, where he originally finished in fourth place before moving up to third following Julian Alaphilippe's relegation.

2021

He started the 2021 season by winning the UAE Tour, Tirreno–Adriatico, Liège–Bastogne–Liège – his first win in a monument and the Tour of Slovenia.

He began the 2021 Tour de France as one of the pre-race favorites along with Primož Roglič, Geraint Thomas and Richard Carapaz. On stage one he finished with the group of favorites eight seconds behind stage winner Julian Alaphilippe and took the lead in the white jersey classification. Pogačar won the fifth stage, the race's first time trial, finishing 18 seconds ahead of Stefan Küng and taking significant time out of his GC rivals. On stage eight he launched an attack, from more than six minutes behind the breakaway, taking over the yellow jersey with a lead of over four and a half minutes on those considered to be contenders for the overall victory. Pogačar extended his GC lead on the ninth stage to Tignes, responding to an attack by Carapaz on the final climb  from the finish and dropping his rivals in the main group, emerging with an overall lead of over two minutes over second placed Ben O'Connor, who had moved up the order after winning the stage from the breakaway.
 
Following stage eleven, which included a double ascent of Mont Ventoux, the closest rivals to Pogačar included Rigoberto Urán, Jonas Vingegaard and Carapaz, but all them remained more than five minutes behind. Pogačar had temporarily lost some time to Vingegaard on the final ascent of Ventoux before catching him on the descent to the finish alongside Carapaz and Uran. Pogačar extended his lead further with wins on stages 17 (to the Col de Portet) and 18 (in Luz Ardiden), by which point he had a lead of 5' 45" over Vingegaard and an unassailable lead in the polka dot jersey classification. On the penultimate 20th stage, a time trial between Libourne and Saint-Émilion, Pogačar conceded half a minute to Vingegaard but retained a lead of over five minutes going into the final stage to Champs-Élysées in Paris.

Pogačar's win made him the youngest cyclist to win consecutive Tours. This was also the second year in a row that he won three distinctive jerseys. Both during and at the end of the Tour there were accusations of doping on social media and in the press due to the dominance Pogačar displayed. When asked about it he answered, "For sure I am not angry about it. They are uncomfortable questions because the [cycling] history was really bad. I totally understand why there are all of these questions."

Jonathan Vaughters, the Directeur Sportif of one of the teams who had a GC rider competing against Pogačar, Team , offered an explanation for how Pogačar was able to be so successful on stage eight. He explained that the twin factors of uncharacteristic weather conditions and chaotic, uncontrolled racing dynamics played a part. In addition to this in previous years there was usually a dominant team who would contain the attacks of any riders considered a threat for victory, whether it was Team Ineos, Team Jumbo-Visma or Movistar Team. During the 2021 Tour teams Ineos and Jumbo had both suffered from the first week crashes and Movistar was not as strong as they had been in years past. As such by the time Pogačar launched his attack late in the stage, there were no teams remaining who were strong enough to keep him in check. Vaughters also stated, "Simply put, the race was so aggressive all day long, along with really the race as a whole on the flats, that basically by the time the peloton was taking in the climbs, they were cooked. This was further exacerbated by the wet conditions."

After the Tour de France, Pogačar won the bronze medal in the men's road race at the Olympic Games after finishing behind Wout van Aert in the sprint for the silver medal. At the end of July, UAE Team Emirates announced that they had agreed a one-year extension to his contract, committing him to the team up to the end of 2027. Pogačar took a break from racing following the Olympics, returning to competition at the Bretagne Classic Ouest–France at the end of August, where he initially managed to follow an attack by Alaphilippe on a gravelled climb 60 km from the finish along with Mikkel Frølich Honoré and Benoît Cosnefroy, but was dropped by the other escapees who went on to take the podium places.

In September he competed at the European Road Championships in Trentino: in the road race, after a number of breakaways had emerged and been caught by the peloton, he was able to follow an attack by Matteo Trentin to form part of a lead group which expanded to include ten riders, however he was unable to keep pace with a further attack from this group 23 km from the end of the race, with a three-man selection of Remco Evenepoel, Sonny Colbrelli and Cosnefroy dropping their rivals and securing themselves the medals. At the Road World Championships in Flanders later that month, Pogačar finished 37th in the road race.
He then moved on to Italy in October to compete in the autumn classics held there: although he failed to finish the Giro dell'Emilia, he made an impression at Tre Valli Varesine, animating the race with a long-race attack from 120 km: although he lost contact with the head of the race due to a puncture he won the sprint in the chase group to finish third. At Milano–Torino, Pogačar managed to keep pace with the other favourites for most of the day, emerging from the peloton's fragmentation in crosswinds 65 km from the end as part of a front group which absorbed the day's early breakaway, and remaining in contention for the win until losing contact with Adam Yates and Roglič in the closing kilometres of the final climb up Superga: he subsequently lost the two-up sprint for third place to João Almeida.

A few days later, Pogačar won his second monument at Il Lombardia, responding to an attack by Vincenzo Nibali by dropping the Italian and the rest of the lead group 30 km from the finish: although he was subsequently joined at the front of the race by Fausto Masnada, Pogačar won the resulting two-man sprint at the finish line. He became the third rider after Fausto Coppi and Eddy Merckx to win two monuments and the Tour in the same year and just fourth rider to win the Tour de France and the Tour of Lombardy in the same season, after Coppi, Merckx and Bernard Hinault, and the first to do so in 42 years.

As the 2021 offseason began the director of the Giro d'Italia, Mauro Vegni, challenged Pogačar to complete the Giro-Tour Double. Vegni stated, "If I'm not wrong, Pantani was the last. So perhaps it's time for a rider to add their name to the roll of honour." Pogačar did state he plans on attempting to win the Giro at some point in the future, but not in 2022. The only riders to complete any grand tour double since Pantani are Alberto Contador in 2008 and Chris Froome in 2017.

2022

Pogačar started the season off with victories in the 2022 UAE Tour, the 2022 Strade Bianche and then won two stages and nearly swept every jersey in the 2022 Tirreno–Adriatico, handily defeating Vingegaard and Landa, just missing the mountains jersey to Quinn Simmons.

To prepare for the Tour de France he rode the 2022 Tour of Slovenia where he dominated the race with ease, to the point he and teammate Rafał Majka played a game of Rock-Paper-Scissors to decide a stage win. Both of them also finished 1st and 2nd in the overall standings ahead of the final podium rider in Domen Novak.

He started the Tour in good position being the highest ranked GC rider during the opening ITT. On stage 5, which was a difficult stage with several cobbled sections, he gained time on every GC rider. On stage 6 he won the sprint finish convincingly, picking up his first stage win of the Tour while rising to 1st place overall and moving into the yellow jersey. The next day, which concluded with a climb on La Planche des Belles Filles, he won his second stage of the Tour by defeating Vingegaard in the sprint. On stage 8 he fought for another win, but finished behind Van Aert and Matthews, although he gained additional bonus seconds. By this point in the race he was in the top three of every jersey classification. Prior to the race entering the high Alps he nearly lost the overall lead, due to a successful breakaway and protesters disrupting the flow of the race, but retained an +0:11 advantage over Lennard Kamna going into stage 11. Stage 11 was the 21st day Pogačar rode in the yellow jersey putting him one behind all-time greats Greg LeMond, Laurent Fignon and Joop Zoetemelk. He would not tie these riders the next day however, as for the first time in his career he lost considerable time to the other GC riders and dropped to 3rd place overall. After the stage he was interviewed, because he was still the leader in the young rider classification, and did not seem terribly concerned he was now over +2:00 off the race lead. On Alpe d'Huez he attacked several times and over the next few intermediate stages took a few digs at Vingegaard, but was not able to force open any time gaps. He did put some time into the other highest placed GC riders and moved into 2nd place after Alpe d'Huez, where he remained at the start of the final week. He lost his key Lieutenant in Rafał Majka, who DNS due to violently throwing a chain on his bike and suffering an injury which revealed itself the following morning.

On stage 17 he followed the pace of Brandon McNulty on the final climbs, who broke all of the GC contenders except for Vingegaard. Inside the final 500 meters he attacked, but Vingegaard soon caught him and then launched an attack of his own. Pogačar dug deep and came around him, besting him on the line to take his third stage win of the Tour, however he did not drop the Dane and as a result essentially faced the same deficit going into the penultimate mountain stage. Throughout both of his previous Tour victories and all through the 2022 edition Pogačar had always somehow found a way to avoid major crashes. On stage 18 his luck finally ran out and he crashed before the final climb of Hautacam began. He didn't appear to suffer serious injury and Vingegaard waited a moment for him to catch up, for which Pogačar offered a handshake as he caught back up to him a kilometre later. As the end of the Hautacam neared Vingegaard rode away, putting over another minute into the defending champ, likely creating too great a deficit to be overcome in the final ITT. Pogačar's aggressive sprinting and battles with Vingegaard essentially blew the rest of field apart to the point that he had about a five-minute lead on 3rd place Geraint Thomas, and was 2nd in the Points Classification without even targeting the Green Jersey. After the conclusion of the ITT on stage 20 his 2nd place overall was solidified. As was his third consecutive white jersey for best young rider, which tied him with Jan Ullrich and Andy Schleck for the most all time.

It was confirmed by Director of the Vuelta a España, Javier Guillén, that Pogačar would not be entering the 2022 edition of the race. Instead it was said that Pogačar was going to concentrate on collecting points in other races in the 2022 UCI World Tour.

Comparisons with Eddy Merckx
While many had been hesitant to make comparisons between Pogačar and Merckx following his first Tour victory, before he even started his second Tour, Cyrille Guimard, a former rival of Merckx and a Directeur Sportif of Greg LeMond, as well as of former Tour champions Van Impe, Fignon and Hinault claimed that Pogačar was above the level of both Merckx and Hinault. Then, following his performance on stage eight, former Tour de France winner Joop Zoetemelk compared the young Slovenian to Merckx. By the end of the race Merckx himself said that he regarded the Slovenian as "the new Cannibal", in reference to his own nickname, also suggesting that "If nothing happens to him, he can certainly win the Tour de France more than five times". After the 2021 Il Lombardia, Merckx said that he has heard plenty of cyclists called "the new Merckx", but none of them ever fulfilled the promise. In Pogačar's case he thinks it is finally true because of the races he has already won. Ernesto Colnago said that, according to his experience, Pogačar will be "the only one following Eddy Merckx".

Personal life
Tadej was born and grew up in Komenda, 20 km north of the Slovenian capital of Ljubljana. His mother Marjeta is a teacher of French and his father Mirko formerly worked in management at a chair factory before joining Tadej's former team  as part of their management team in 2021. Tadej is the third of four siblings.

Pogačar lives in Monaco with his partner, fellow Slovenian professional cyclist Urška Žigart. They became engaged in September 2021. His role model is Alberto Contador. He was also an admirer of Fränk and Andy Schleck while growing up.

In addition to his native Slovenian, Pogačar speaks fluent English and Italian.

Major results

Road

2016
 1st  Time trial, National Junior Championships
 1st  Overall Giro della Lunigiana
1st  Points classification
1st Stage 3
 1st Stage 2b Course de la Paix Juniors
 3rd  Road race, UEC European Junior Championships
2017
 2nd Raiffeisen Grand Prix
 3rd Time trial, National Under-23 Championships
 3rd Overall Tour de Hongrie
 4th Overall Istrian Spring Trophy
 5th Overall Tour of Slovenia
1st  Young rider classification
 5th Overall Carpathian Couriers Race
1st  Young rider classification
 7th Piccolo Giro di Lombardia
 8th GP Laguna
 9th GP Capodarco
 9th Croatia–Slovenia
 10th Giro del Belvedere
2018
 National Under-23 Championships
1st  Road race
1st  Time trial
 1st  Overall Tour de l'Avenir
 1st  Overall Grand Prix Priessnitz spa
1st  Mountains classification
1st  Young rider classification
1st Stage 3
 1st  Overall Giro del Friuli-Venezia Giulia
1st  Young rider classification
 1st Trofeo Gianfranco Bianchin
 2nd Gran Premio Palio del Recioto
 3rd Overall Istrian Spring Trophy
 4th Overall Tour of Slovenia
1st  Young rider classification
 4th Poreč Trophy
 4th Raiffeisen Grand Prix
 5th GP Laguna
 7th Road race, UCI World Under-23 Championships
 8th Giro del Belvedere
2019
 1st  Time trial, National Championships
 1st  Overall Tour of California
1st  Young rider classification
1st Stage 6
 1st  Overall Volta ao Algarve
1st  Young rider classification
1st Stage 2
 3rd Overall Vuelta a España
1st  Young rider classification
1st Stages 9, 13 & 20
 4th Overall Tour of Slovenia
1st  Young rider classification
 6th Overall Tour of the Basque Country
1st  Young rider classification
 6th GP Miguel Induráin
 7th Gran Premio di Lugano
2020
 National Championships
1st  Time trial
2nd Road race
 1st  Overall Tour de France
1st  Mountains classification
1st  Young rider classification
1st Stages 9, 15 & 20 (ITT)
 1st  Overall Volta a la Comunitat Valenciana
1st  Young rider classification
1st Stages 2 & 4
 2nd Overall UAE Tour
1st  Young rider classification
1st Stage 5
 3rd Liège–Bastogne–Liège
 4th Overall Critérium du Dauphiné
 9th La Flèche Wallonne
2021
 1st  Overall Tour de France
1st  Mountains classification
1st  Young rider classification
1st Stages 5 (ITT), 17 & 18
 1st  Overall Tirreno–Adriatico
1st  Mountains classification
1st  Young rider classification
1st Stage 4
 1st  Overall UAE Tour
1st  Young rider classification
1st Stage 3
 1st  Overall Tour of Slovenia
1st  Mountains classification
1st Stage 2
 1st Liège–Bastogne–Liège
 1st Giro di Lombardia
 3rd  Road race, Olympic Games
 National Road Championships
3rd Time trial
5th Road race
 3rd Overall Tour of the Basque Country
1st Stage 3
 3rd Tre Valli Varesine
 4th Milano–Torino
 5th Road race, UEC European Championships
 7th Strade Bianche
 10th Time trial, UCI World Championships
2022
 1st  Overall Tirreno–Adriatico
1st  Points classification
1st  Young rider classification
1st Stages 4 & 6
 1st  Overall UAE Tour
1st  Young rider classification
1st Stages 4 & 7
 1st  Overall Tour of Slovenia
1st  Points classification
1st Stages 3 & 5
 1st Giro di Lombardia
 1st Strade Bianche
 1st Grand Prix Cycliste de Montréal
 1st Tre Valli Varesine
 2nd Overall Tour de France
1st  Young rider classification
1st Stages 6, 7 & 17
Held  after Stages 6–10
 2nd Giro dell'Emilia
 4th Tour of Flanders
 5th Milan–San Remo
 6th Time trial, UCI World Championships
 10th Dwars door Vlaanderen
2023
 1st  Overall Paris–Nice
1st  Points classification
1st  Young rider classification
1st Stages 4, 7 & 8
 1st  Overall Vuelta a Andalucía
1st  Points classification
1st Stages 1, 2 & 4
 1st Clásica Jaén Paraíso Interior
 4th Milan–San Remo

General classification results timeline

Classics results timeline

Major championships results timeline

Cyclo-cross
2018–2019
 1st  National Championships
2021–2022
 Slovenian Cup
1st Ljubljana
2022–2023
 Slovenian Cup
2nd Ljubljana

Awards
 Vélo d'Or: 2021
 International Flandrien of the Year: 2021, 2022

References

External links

 

1998 births
Competitors at the 2018 Mediterranean Games
Living people
Mediterranean Games competitors for Slovenia
People from the Municipality of Komenda
Slovenian male cyclists
Slovenian Tour de France stage winners
Slovenian Vuelta a España stage winners
Tour de France winners
Olympic cyclists of Slovenia
Cyclists at the 2020 Summer Olympics
Olympic bronze medalists for Slovenia
Olympic medalists in cycling
Medalists at the 2020 Summer Olympics